The Musée des Beaux-Arts de Nice in Nice, France at 33 av. des Baumettes was built in the former private mansion built in 1878 by the Russian Princess, . Named for the artist Jules Chéret who lived and worked in Nice during his final years, the museum opened as the "Palais des Arts Jules Chéret" on 7 January 1928.

Collection 
The museum houses a collection of art spanning the past four centuries. The small museum has sculptures by Jean-Baptiste Carpeaux, François Rude, Michel de Tarnowsky and Auguste Rodin, plus ceramic pieces by Pablo Picasso. Some of the paintings are from:

Marie Bashkirtseff
Pierre Bonnard
Jan Brueghel the Elder
Bronzino
Benjamin Constant
Kees van Dongen
Raoul Dufy
Jean-Honoré Fragonard
Marie Laurencin
Luc-Olivier Merson
Édouard Vuillard

Gallery

References

External links

Michel de Tarnowsky website

Art museums and galleries in France
Museums in Nice
Art museums established in 1928
1928 establishments in France